Mazsalaca Municipality is a former municipality in Vidzeme, Latvia. The municipality was formed in 2009 by merging Ramata parish, Sēļi parish, Skaņkalne parish and Mazsalaca town with its countryside territory, the administrative centre being Mazsalaca. In 2010 Mazsalaca parish was created from the countryside territory of Mazsalaca town.

On 1 July 2021, Mazsalaca Municipality ceased to exist and its territory was merged into Valmiera Municipality.

See also 
 Administrative divisions of Latvia

References

External links 
 

 
Former municipalities of Latvia